Arnaud Guedj (born 19 July 1997) is a French professional footballer who plays as a midfielder for Olympic Charleroi.

Career
Born in Le Mans, Guedj is a product of his native Le Mans FC youth sportive system. In 2014, he was transferred to OGC Nice and played 16 games for the reserves in the Championnat National 2.

In July 2017, Guedj signed a two-year contract with the Ukrainian Premier League club Zirka Kropyvnytskyi. He made his debut in the Ukrainian Premier League for FC Zirka on 16 July 2017, playing in a match against FC Karpaty Lviv.

References

External links 

1997 births
Living people
Footballers from Le Mans
French footballers
French expatriate footballers
France youth international footballers
Association football midfielders
Le Mans FC players
OGC Nice players
FC Zirka Kropyvnytskyi players
KF Skënderbeu Korçë players
FC Universitatea Cluj players
FC Blue Boys Muhlenbach players
Championnat National 2 players
Ukrainian Premier League players
Kategoria Superiore players
Liga II players
Luxembourg National Division players
Belgian Third Division players
Expatriate footballers in Ukraine
Expatriate footballers in Albania
Expatriate footballers in Romania
Expatriate footballers in Luxembourg
Expatriate footballers in Belgium
French expatriate sportspeople in Ukraine
French expatriate sportspeople in Albania
French expatriate sportspeople in Romania
French expatriate sportspeople in Luxembourg
French expatriate sportspeople in Belgium